David E. Scherman (1916 – May 5, 1997) was an American photojournalist and editor. 

Born in Manhattan to a Jewish family, he grew up in New Rochelle, New York and then attended Dartmouth College. He graduated in 1936 and became a photographer for Life magazine, covering World War II. He teamed up with a Condé Nast Publications photographer Lee Miller for many of these assignments. One photograph by Scherman of Miller in the bathtub of Adolf Hitler's apartment in Munich is one of the most iconic images from the Miller-Scherman partnership.

Scherman changed career from photographer to editor and was employed as senior editor when Life magazine ceased its weekly format in 1972. He died of cancer at age 81

Publications 
Scherman contributed as an editor and author to various Life and photography publications including:

The Best of Life, 1973, 
With John R. McCrary - First of the Many, 1981, 
With Rosemarie Redlich - Literary America: A Chronicle of American Writers from 1607-1952, 1978, 
With Richard Wilcox - Literary England: Photographs of Places Made Memorable in English Literature, 1944, 
With Antony Penrose - Lee Miller's War: Photographer and Correspondent With the Allies in Europe 1944-45, 1992,

References

External links 
 

 

1916 births
1997 deaths
Photographers from New York (state)
American Jews
Jewish American artists
American photojournalists
American magazine editors
Deaths from cancer in New York (state)
Artists from New Rochelle, New York
People from Stony Point, New York
Life (magazine) photojournalists
Journalists from New York (state)
American war correspondents
20th-century American journalists
American male journalists